Lance Morton (born 14 April 1948) is a former  Australian rules footballer who played with Hawthorn and South Melbourne in the Victorian Football League (VFL) and North Adelaide Football Club in the South Australian National Football League (SANFL).

Notes

External links 

Living people
1948 births
Australian rules footballers from Victoria (Australia)
Hawthorn Football Club players
Sydney Swans players
North Adelaide Football Club players